Exoteleia ithycosma is a moth of the family Gelechiidae. It is found in Guyana.

The wingspan is about 10 mm. The forewings are dark fuscous with four blue-leaden-metallic transverse streaks, the first towards the base, rather thick, the second beyond one-third, slender, white on the costa, the third beyond the middle, not reaching the costa, interrupted below the middle, the fourth submarginal, slightly sinuate inwards below the middle. There is a white dot on the costa before two-thirds, edged beneath by a leaden-metallic dot, where a fine straight pale brownish line runs to the dorsum at three-fourths. There is a slender pale brownish streak along the termen. The hindwings are dark fuscous.

References

Moths described in 1914
Exoteleia